National Secondary Route 130, or just Route 130 (or ) is a National Road Route of Costa Rica, located in the Alajuela province.

Description
In Alajuela province the route covers Alajuela canton (Alajuela, San Isidro, Sabanilla districts), Poás canton (San Pedro district).

References

Highways in Costa Rica